Robert Lacy is a writer.

Robert Lacy may also refer to:

Robert Lacy (MP) for Stamford (UK Parliament constituency)
Robert Lacy, Bishop of Limerick

See also
Robert de Lacy, two barons of Pontefract
Robert Lacey (disambiguation)